Romanian Braille is the braille alphabet of the Romanian language. It has the 25 letters of basic French Braille (no w) plus the following additional letters: 

Note that w is absent in Romanian braille as its usage in the Romanian language is very rare and occurs only in foreign words.
Much of the punctuation and formatting (caps, italics) is like old French Braille: 
 [period],  ?,  (...),  “...”,  *, 
as seen in the chart at right.  In addition, the dash and ellipsis are both 
 —, ..., 
values which were also reported by UNESCO (1990) but could not be confirmed by UNESCO (2013).  

UNESCO (1990) reports inner quotation marks  ‘...’, while the chart at right appears to show a highly unusual double point, for the apostrophe.  Other sources, however, have the normal single point, .

References
Lorelei Mihală, 'Our Letter, a magazine for the blind in Romania', European Journalism Center, February 8, 2012

French-ordered braille alphabets
Romanian language